Frances Kay Behm (born 1969) is a United States district judge of the United States District Court for the Eastern District of Michigan.

Education 

Behm received a Bachelor of Arts summa cum laude from Albion College in 1991 and a Juris Doctor from  the University of Michigan Law School in 1994.

Legal career 

From 1994 to 1997, Behm was an associate at Braun Kendrick Finbeiner in Saginaw, Michigan. From 1997 to 2008, she was an associate at Winegarden, Haley, Lindholm, & Robertson in Flint, Michigan. She was a solo practitioner from 2008 to 2009. She focused on business litigation and probate law while in private practice. Behm has held numerous positions with the Michigan Probate Judges' Association and has served on the board of directors of Big Brothers Big Sisters of Flint and Genesee County. Behm previously chaired the Parent Representation Pilot Project, which provides additional social services and legal representation for parents in child welfare proceedings.

In 2021, Behm was sued in federal court by pro se plaintiff Ca'ron Lloyd. Lloyd alleged damages against several defendants arising from his arrest and conviction before Behm. The presiding judge dismissed Behm from the suit for judicial immunity, but allowed the suit to proceed against two of the other defendants.

Judicial career

State court service 

From April 10, 2009 to December 15, 2022, she served as probate judge of the Genesee County Circuit and Probate Courts after being appointed by Michigan Governor Jennifer Granholm. She was appointed to fill the vacancy left by the death of Judge Robert E. Weiss. Behm was assigned to the family division of the circuit court from May 2009 until December 2018 and is currently assigned to the general civil/criminal division and business court.

Federal judicial service 

On June 29, 2022, President Joe Biden announced his intent to nominate Behm to serve as a United States district judge of the United States District Court for the Eastern District of Michigan. On July 11, 2022, her nomination was sent to the Senate. President Biden nominated Behm to the seat vacated by Judge David M. Lawson, who assumed senior status on August 6, 2021. On July 27, 2022, a hearing on her nomination was held before the Senate Judiciary Committee. On September 15, 2022, her nomination was reported out of committee by a 12–10 vote. On December 6, 2022, the United States Senate invoked cloture on her nomination by a 47–46 vote. Later that day, her nomination was confirmed by a 49–47 vote. She received her judicial commission on December 15, 2022.

Personal life 

Behm is from Grand Blanc, Michigan. She lives with her husband, Michael Behm, an attorney.

References

External links 

1969 births
Living people
20th-century American women lawyers
20th-century American lawyers
21st-century American judges
21st-century American women judges
21st-century American women lawyers
21st-century American lawyers
Albion College alumni
Judges of the United States District Court for the Eastern District of Michigan
Michigan lawyers
Michigan state court judges
People from Alma, Michigan
People from Genesee County, Michigan
United States district court judges appointed by Joe Biden
University of Michigan Law School alumni